Huangjinyuan is a subdistrict of Wangcheng District, Changsha, Hunan, China. It is located on the center of West Wangcheng, the subdistrict is bordered by Gaotangling and Wushan Subdistricts to the north, Bairuopu town to the west, Leifeng Subdistrict to the south, Baishazhou subdistrict to the east.

History
Huangjinyuan was formed by the revocation of Huangjin (and setting up three new subdistricts) in 2012.

In June 2012, Huangjin was changed from a town as a subdistrict. On August 28, 2012, Huangjin was divided into three subdistricts, they are Jinshanqiao, Huangjinyuan and Liaojiaping subdistricts. 
 The Huangjinyuan subdistrict contains Guifang, Huangjinyuan and Yingxiongling three villages.
 The Jinshanqiao subdistrict contains Jinping, Jinshanqiao and Tonglin'ao three residential communities.
 The Liaojiiaping subdistrict contains Baima, Liaojiaping and Sanyi three villages. Liaojiaping was merged to Leifeng subdistrict on November 19, 2015.

References

Township-level divisions of Wangcheng
Wangcheng